XO-4 is a star located approximately 896 light-years away from Earth in the Lynx constellation. It has a magnitude of about 11 and cannot be seen with the naked eye but is visible through a small telescope. A search for a binary companion star using adaptive optics at MMT Observatory was negative.

The star XO-4 is named Koit. The name was selected in the NameExoWorlds campaign by Estonia, during the 100th anniversary of the IAU. Koit is Estonian for dawn, and was named for a character in a folk tale written by Friedrich Robert Faehlmann.

Planetary system
One known exoplanet, XO-4b, which is classified as a hot jupiter, orbits XO-4. This exoplanet was discovered in 2008 by the XO Telescope project using the transit method. It has been named Hämarik, meaning dusk, and referring to a character from the same Faehlmann story featuring Koit.

Notes

References

External links
 

F-type main-sequence stars
Lynx (constellation)
Planetary transit variables
Planetary systems with one confirmed planet